Chen Yanping (born January 7, 1966) is a retired Chinese triple jumper.

International competitions

References

1966 births
Living people
Chinese male triple jumpers
Olympic athletes of China
Athletes (track and field) at the 1988 Summer Olympics
Athletes (track and field) at the 1992 Summer Olympics
Asian Games medalists in athletics (track and field)
Athletes (track and field) at the 1990 Asian Games
Universiade medalists in athletics (track and field)
Asian Games gold medalists for China
Medalists at the 1990 Asian Games
Universiade bronze medalists for China
Medalists at the 1991 Summer Universiade
20th-century Chinese people